Mark Andrew Pritchard PC (born 22 November 1966 and formerly known as Mark Mallon) is a British Conservative politician and consultant. He has been the Member of Parliament (MP) for The Wrekin in Shropshire since the 2005 general election.

Early life and Career
Pritchard was born on 22 November 1966. He was brought up and educated in Herefordshire. He remarked on BBC Radio 4 that he comes from an "unorthodox background" for a Conservative MP. For the first five years of his life he was brought up in an orphanage in Hereford, and later grew up in foster care living in a council house. He told his local newspaper that his early years were years of "love and warmth" and that he did not have "a single bad memory" of his time in the orphanage.

Pritchard was first elected for the Conservative Party as a councillor on Harrow Council in London. Under his former name of Mark Mallon, he was elected as the Conservative Party candidate at a by-election for Pinner West ward in January 1993, but lost his seat at the council elections in May 1994, coming fifth. A supporter of Margaret Thatcher, Pritchard worked as the campaign manager to her successor in the London seat of Finchley, Hartley Booth, who served in Parliament between 1992 and 1997. Pritchard, under his previous name Mallon, co-wrote a book with Booth on the subject of long-term unemployment and homelessness, which they self-published in 1994, shortly after Booth resigned as a parliamentary private secretary following press revelations of a relationship with a House of Commons researcher.

After working for Hartley Booth, Pritchard spent a brief period at Conservative Central Office, working as a press officer, in the 1997 General Election campaign. He went on to set up his own business and was elected as a Conservative councillor in Surrey on Woking Borough Council, for the Brookwood ward, in May 2000. He did not defend his seat at the end of his term in 2004.

Parliamentary career
Pritchard unsuccessfully contested the constituency of Warley in the West Midlands for the Conservative Party in the 2001 general election where he was defeated by John Spellar of the Labour party.

Pritchard was first elected to parliament for The Wrekin constituency in 2005, defeating Peter Bradley, the incumbent Labour MP, by just 942 votes although this represented a 5.4% swing from Labour to Conservative. He was one of 130 candidates who received help from 20,000 countryside campaigners from the Countryside Party who "poured into marginal seats all over Britain" in an attempt to unseat anti-hunting Labour MPs. During the campaign pro-hunt supporters "delivered 3.4 million leaflets, addressed 2.1 million envelopes, put up 55,000 posters and provided 170,000 hours of campaigning." Pritchard was also one of 30 Conservative MPs who benefited from large "below the radar" donations paid to candidates from a secret Conservative Party donors' fund set up by Lord Ashcroft, Lord Steinberg and the Midlands Industrial Council.

After retaining his seat at the 2010 general election, he was joint secretary of the 1922 Committee between 2010 and 2012.

Pritchard was at the centre of a political story in 2010 when he had a public confrontation with John Bercow, the Speaker of the House of Commons, who had told him to stand aside in a corridor. Pritchard then told him, "You are not fucking royalty, Mr Speaker!"

Pritchard was appointed by Prime Minister David Cameron as a member of the Joint Committee on the National Security Strategy 2010–2015. He was appointed by Foreign Secretary, William Hague to the NATO Parliamentary Assembly 2005–2010. He was a Member of the House of Commons Joint Committee on Human Rights 2015–2017.

He is a graduate of the Armed Forces Parliamentary Scheme (Army). He has visited Iraq and Afghanistan.

Pritchard was appointed to the post of deputy chairman of the Conservative Party's International Office in 2010 but resigned in January 2012 over policy differences on: "a lack of national and individual aspiration, immigration, and Europe" – what some commentators called "the Holy Trinity of the Conservative right".

He is the vice-chairman of the Conservative Parliamentary Foreign Affairs and Defence Committee. He formerly served as 'backbench support' to William Hague and to Dr Liam Fox, the former Defence Secretary, whilst in opposition.

In November 2013, Pritchard was subject to a series of articles in The Daily Telegraph regarding revelations from undercover investigations that he had offered to use his political contacts to set up business deals with foreign officials and ministers in return for being paid hundreds of thousands of pounds. Following the revelations Pritchard referred himself to the Standards Commissioner. Kathryn Hudson, the Standards Commissioner, subsequently announced that she would not investigate Pritchard, because there was "insufficient evidence", although the Daily Telegraph protested that the Commissioner has failed to contact the newspaper for its evidence. Pritchard maintained that he had not broken the Code of Conduct and that his business contacts were unconnected to his parliamentary work.

In December 2014, he was arrested and later bailed over an allegation of rape. On 6 January 2015, the police inquiry was dropped on the basis that there was insufficient evidence for a case to proceed. Pritchard urged a review of the law on anonymity for people accused of rape, saying that it was unfair that he was publicly identified whilst his accuser remained anonymous.

He was appointed by Foreign Secretary Philip Hammond as a member of the British delegation to the Parliamentary Assembly of the Council of Europe, a 47-nation body – separate to the EU – which upholds human rights, democracy and the rule of law, from 2014 to 2017.

In January 2017, it was reported that an inquiry had been launched into all-party parliamentary groups amid concerns they were being used to bypass lobbying rules. Pritchard was singled out in reports as the parliamentarian who sits on the most APPGs, with membership of 41 separate groups.

In June 2017 Prime Minister Theresa May appointed Pritchard as Leader of the UK delegation to the Organization for Security and Co-operation in Europe's Parliamentary Assembly.

In December 2017, UK Prime Minister, Theresa May, appointed him to be the Leader of the UK's delegation to the Organisation for Security and Cooperation in Europe (OSCE). Also in 2017, he was appointed as the UK's first Trade Envoy to Georgia and Armenia working with the Department for International Trade.

In the House of Commons he sits on the Panel of Chairs. Pritchard has served on several select committees: Transport, Works & Pensions, Wales, and Environmental Audit. He is chairman or vice-chairman of several all-party parliamentary groups, including the ASEAN region, and Africa. Pritchard is also an executive member of the British Parliamentary Group. In 2015, Pritchard succeeded Michael Connarty MP as the joint-chairman of the All Party Parliamentary Jazz Appreciation Group

Although a eurosceptic, Pritchard supported the official position of his party and campaigned for the United Kingdom to remain in the European Union before the EU membership referendum on 23 June 2016. Since the result was announced, Pritchard has continued to support the party leadership and now advocates leaving the European Union. He has never rebelled against the Government in the current Parliament.

In March 2018, he was one of three MPs accused of using threatening and intimidating behaviour towards parliamentary clerks. An investigation by the BBC claimed Pritchard used foul language in an exchange with a clerk and was known for having a bad temper. He responded that "there was no truth in the claims whatsoever", saying that he never used foul language and had never had a complaint levelled against him.

In June 2018 Pritchard was appointed by the Organization for Security and Co-operation in Europe's President as the OSCE Parliamentary Assembly's Special Representative to South East Europe. Acting as the OSCE's diplomatic interlocutor to the Western Balkans, Bulgaria, Romania and Greece. He retired from the role in June 2020 having been appointed to the UK's Intelligence and Security Committee.

Pritchard previously employed his wife as his Office Manager on a salary up to £45,000. The practice of MPs employing family members has been criticised by some sections of the media on the lines that it promotes nepotism.

He is Director of Mark Pritchard Advisory Ltd, a consultancy, from which he earns an annual income of over £65,000. Additional employment for MPs as consultants has been criticised and his Labour Party opponents have called for the practice to be outlawed, but it is currently legal.

In July 2020 he was appointed to Parliament's Intelligence and Security Committee.

In February 2021 he was appointed by Her Majesty Queen Elizabeth II to the Privy Council.

Political positions
Regarded as right of centre, he believes in tougher sentences for criminals, but has also supported the coalition government's efforts to increase the number of treatment and rehabilitation centres. He is on record as saying he would not support the restoration of the death penalty and has served as the Joint Chairman of the All Party Group for the Abolition of the Death Penalty since 2012. His main political contributions focus on defence, foreign affairs, counter-terrorism, home affairs, anti-abortion and animal welfare issues.

Same-sex marriage

Pritchard is not in favour of gay marriage, having voted against this on several occasions.

Animal welfare
Pritchard is known for his advocacy of animal welfare issues and introduced three animal welfare related private Ten Minute Rule Bills in the period 2006–09. These were the Sale of Endangered Animals on the Internet (Prohibition) Bill, 2006; Primates As Pets (Prohibition) Bill, 2007 and the Common Birds (Protection) Bill, 2009.

In June 2011 he successfully moved a motion to ban wild animals in circuses. In the House of Commons he stated that he had been placed under pressure by the prime minister to withdraw the motion, first by being offered a job, and then by being threatened. Pritchard has been nominated for numerous animal welfare awards including the Dods Charity Champion Award for Animal Welfare.

Europe
Pritchard is a Eurosceptic, defining himself as a "mainstream Eurosceptic". He was one of the "Tory Rebels" who oversaw the largest post-war defeat of any Conservative government concerning a European Referendum. In 2011, he called for an "in/out referendum" on the European Union. Central to Pritchard's argument was that "The majority of Britons living today have never had a say on Europe". Pritchard referred to this group as "the great disenfranchised".

Pritchard supported the motion calling for a "real terms cut" in the EU's multi-annual budget in 2012. He was joined by fellow Eurosceptic MP, Mark Reckless, to draft the so-called 'Reckless-Pritchard amendment' which saw David Cameron's government defeated over the issue.  Reckless later defected to Ukip. Pritchard said that the vote would "strengthen David Cameron's hand in Brussels".

Pritchard has also been outspoken on immigration issues, being one of the co-signatories of an amendment calling for the extension UK border controls for Romanians and Bulgarians beyond 1 January 2014. He also held a debate on the issue in April 2013.

On 31 January 2016, Pritchard declared himself a "reluctant inner", supporting Britain's membership of the EU. In the 2016 referendum on the UK's membership of the EU Pritchard campaigned for a Remain vote. He set out a number of security and foreign policy concerns in an article in The Sunday Times.

Climate change
Pritchard earns £325 an hour as an advisor to Linden Energy holdings, an organisation which promotes the belief that climate change is inevitable and mitigation is pointless.  Mark Maslin, professor of Earth system science at University College London claims Linden Energy is a classic climate denier. Prichard was criticised by the Green Party for taking up the role and delaying his entry in the registry of interest by 2 months.

Abortion
Pritchard is registered as the vice-chairman of the All-Party Parliamentary Pro-Life Group group. He was the mover of an amendment to the Human Fertilisation and Embryology Act 2008 in the 2005–2010 parliament, which sought to reduce the term-limit for abortions from 24 weeks to 16 weeks.

Personal life
In July 2013, Mark Pritchard announced that he was divorcing his wife of 15 years, Sondra, following their separation in April 2013.

Pritchard has several business interests outside politics, with commitments to some 55 hours of non-parliamentary duties each month.

References

External links
Mark Pritchard MP official constituency website
Blog at ConservativeHome
Mark Pritchard MP Conservative Party profile

1966 births
Conservative Party (UK) MPs for English constituencies
Councillors in the London Borough of Harrow
Councillors in Surrey
Living people
Members of the Parliament of the United Kingdom for constituencies in Shropshire
Members of the Privy Council of the United Kingdom
UK MPs 2005–2010
UK MPs 2010–2015
UK MPs 2015–2017
UK MPs 2017–2019
UK MPs 2019–present
Free Enterprise Group